Noether's theorem states that every differentiable symmetry of the action of a physical system has a corresponding conservation law.

Noether's theorem may also refer to:

Theorems by Emmy Noether
 Noether's second theorem, on infinite-dimensional Lie algebras and differential equations
 Noether normalization lemma, on finitely generated algebra over a field
 Noether isomorphism theorems in abstract algebra

Theorems by Max Noether
 Max Noether's theorem, several theorems
 Noether's theorem on rationality for surfaces
 Noether inequality, a property of compact minimal complex surfaces that restricts the topological type of the underlying topological 4-manifold

See also
 Emmy Noether (1882–1935), German Jewish mathematician
 Herglotz–Noether theorem, in special relativity
 Lasker–Noether theorem, that states that every Noetherian ring is a Lasker ring
 Skolem–Noether theorem, which characterizes the automorphisms of simple rings
 Albert–Brauer–Hasse–Noether theorem, in algebraic number theory
 Brill–Noether theory, in the theory of algebraic curves